More Modern Classics is a compilation album of music by English singer-songwriter Paul Weller, originally released in 2014. The album was released in three versions: 1 disc CD compilation, a vinyl edition and a 3 disc CD "deluxe" edition.

Track listing 
All titles written by Paul Weller except where noted

Deluxe Edition Disc 1 / Standard Edition

Deluxe Edition Disc 2
 Frightened
 With Time And Temperance
 A Bullet For Everyone
 One X One
 Don't Make Promises
 One Way Road
 Birds
 Blink And You'll Miss It
 Roll Along Summer
 The Pebble and the Boy
 Empty Ring
 Why Walk When You Can Run
 Night Lights
 7 & 3 Is The Striker's Name
 Trees
 Up The Dosage
 Green
 Paperchase
 Be Happy Children
 The Olde Original

Deluxe Edition Disc 3
All I Wanna Do (Is Be With You)
 From The Floorboards Up
 The Attic
 Around The Lake
 Andromeda
 That Dangerous Age
 When Your Garden's Overgrown
 Wake Up The Nation
 Savages
 Time of the Season
 Aim High
 Daydream

2014 greatest hits albums
Paul Weller compilation albums